is a Japanese footballer who plays as a goalkeeper. He currently play for Machida Zelvia.

Career
On 30 December 2021, Popp officially transfer to J2 club, Machida Zelvia from 2022 season.

Personal life
Popp was born in Japan, his father is American while his mother is Japanese.

Career statistics

Club
Updated to the start of 2023 season.

Honours
 Kawasaki Frontale
 J1 League: 2017, 2018

References

External links
Profile at Kawasaki Frontale

Profile at FC Gifu
Profile at FC Machida Zelvia

1994 births
Living people
Association football people from Tokyo Metropolis
Japanese footballers
Japanese people of American descent
J1 League players
J2 League players
Tokyo Verdy players
FC Gifu players
Oita Trinita players
Kawasaki Frontale players
Fagiano Okayama players
FC Machida Zelvia players
Association football goalkeepers
People from Hino, Tokyo
Footballers at the 2014 Asian Games
Japan youth international footballers
Asian Games competitors for Japan